The Crimson Canary is a 1945 American mystery film directed by John Hoffman and written by Henry Blankfort and Peggy Phillips. The film stars Noah Beery Jr., Lois Collier, John Litel, Steven Geray, Claudia Drake and Danny Morton. The film was released on November 9, 1945, by Universal Pictures.

Plot

Cast        
Noah Beery Jr. as Danny Brooks
Lois Collier as Jean Walker
John Litel as Roger Quinn
Steven Geray as Vic Miller
Claudia Drake as Anita Lane
Danny Morton as Johnny
Jimmie Dodd as Chuck 
Steve Brodie as Hillary
John Kellogg as Keys
Arthur Space as Detective Carlyle
Josh White as himself
Coleman Hawkins as himself
Oscar Pettiford as himself

Critical reception
Writing in AllMovie, writer and film critic Hal Erickson described the film as "an offbeat murder mystery," and that "[although] the plot is nothing special, the wall-to-wall music and 'hip' ambience of Crimson Canary result in a better than average Universal 'B' [movie]". A review in TV Guide reported that "equal attention is paid to both suspects and their motives," and that "Cool tunes color this one hot."

References

External links
 

1945 films
1940s English-language films
American mystery films
1945 mystery films
Universal Pictures films
American black-and-white films
Films directed by John Hoffman
1940s American films